Kodama Kyūichi (August 1893 – May 23, 1960) was a Japanese Home Ministry government official and politician.

Biography 
He was born in Yamaguchi Prefecture. He was a graduate of the University of Tokyo. He was governor of Shimane Prefecture (1936–1937), Fukuoka Prefecture (1939–1940), Aichi Prefecture (1940–1941) and Hiroshima (October 1945).

References

Bibliography
歴代知事編纂会編『新編日本の歴代知事』歴代知事編纂会、1991年。
 秦郁彦編『日本官僚制総合事典：1868 - 2000』東京大学出版会、2001年。

1893 births
1960 deaths
Japanese Home Ministry government officials
Governors of Shimane Prefecture
Governors of Fukuoka Prefecture
Governors of Aichi Prefecture
Governors of Hiroshima
People from Yamaguchi Prefecture
University of Tokyo alumni